Porthecla willmotti is a butterfly in the family Lycaenidae. It is found in eastern Ecuador and eastern Peru at altitudes between 1,500 and 2,200 meters.

The length of the forewings is 18.2 mm for males and 18.1 mm for females. Adults are on wing from August to November.

Etymology
The species is named for Keith Willmott, who has spent years studying the butterflies of Ecuador and was the first to discover Ecuadorian males of this species.

References

Butterflies described in 2011
Eumaeini